Nicolae Bălcescu is a commune in Constanța County, Northern Dobruja, Romania.

The commune includes two villages:
 Nicolae Bălcescu (historical names: Danachioi, ; Carol I) - named after the Romanian historian and revolutionary Nicolae Bălcescu
 Dorobanțu

Demographics
At the 2011 census, Nicolae Bălcescu had 4,298 Romanians (97.26%), 5  Hungarians (0.11%), 75 Roma  (1.70%), 33 Tatars (0.75%), 8 others (0.18%).

References

Communes in Constanța County
Localities in Northern Dobruja